Steffi Graf was the defending champion but lost in the quarterfinals to Amanda Coetzer.

Mary Joe Fernández won in the final 6–4, 6–2 against Mary Pierce.

Seeds
A champion seed is indicated in bold text while text in italics indicates the round in which that seed was eliminated. The top eight seeds received a bye to the second round.

  Steffi Graf (quarterfinals)
  Jana Novotná (semifinals)
  Lindsay Davenport (second round)
  Conchita Martínez (third round)
  Arantxa Sánchez Vicario (third round)
  Iva Majoli (quarterfinals)
  Amanda Coetzer (semifinals)
  Irina Spîrlea (third round)
  Karina Habšudová (second round)
  Mary Joe Fernández (champion)
  Brenda Schultz-McCarthy (second round)
  Mary Pierce (final)
  Barbara Paulus (first round)
  Judith Wiesner (third round)
  Ruxandra Dragomir (third round)
  Elena Likhovtseva (first round)

Draw

Finals

Top half

Section 1

Section 2

Bottom half

Section 3

Section 4

References
 1997 WTA German Open Draw

WTA German Open
1997 WTA Tour